The Welsh Language Commissioner is a Welsh Government officer, overseeing an independent advisory body of the same name. The position was created following the passing of the Welsh Language (Wales) Measure 2011, effective on 1 April 2012, with the aim of promoting and facilitating the use of the Welsh language. This entails raising awareness of the official status of the Welsh language in Wales and by imposing standards on organisations. This, in turn, will lead to the establishment of rights for Welsh speakers. 

According to the Commissioner's website, there are two principles that underpin the work of the Commissioner, namely:
 Welsh should not be treated less favourably than the English language in Wales
 People should be able to live their lives in Wales through the medium of Welsh if they so wish.

The Commissioner's work is politically independent, and the position of a commissioner lasts seven years.

Commissioners 

 Meri Huws (2012–2019)
 Aled Roberts (2019–2022)
 Efa Gruffudd Jones (2023–)

Deputy commissioner 

 Gwenith Price

The Commissioner's role 
The Commissioner may do anything they consider appropriate to:
 Promote the use of Welsh
 Facilitate the use of Welsh
 Work towards ensuring that Welsh is treated no less favourably than English.

This includes promoting opportunities to use Welsh and encourage best practice in the use of Welsh by people dealing with other persons, or providing services to other persons. Areas of their work also include legal issues, preparing and publishing reports, research, educational activities and written recommendations to Ministers of the Government of Wales. The Commissioner can also give advice to people.

See also
National Assembly for Wales (Official Languages) Act 2012

References

External links 
 Official website of the Welsh Language Commissioner
Welsh Language (Wales) Measure 2011 as enacted

Welsh language
Politics of Wales
2012 establishments in Wales
Language policy in the United Kingdom
Ombudsman posts
Language Commissioner